The 2006 Woking Council election took place on 4 May 2006 to elect members of Woking Borough Council in Surrey, England. One third of the council was up for election and the council stayed under no overall control.

After the election, the composition of the council was:
Liberal Democrat 18
Conservative 15
Labour 3

Campaign
6 sitting councillors stood down at the election including the former Conservative leader of the council Jim Armitage and the independent Mike Copham who had resigned from the Conservatives.

Housing and development was a contentious issue during the campaign, with the council being required to build 240 houses a year for the next 20 years under the South East Plan. Both the Conservatives and Liberal Democrats fought the election on a platform of opposing overdevelopment and protecting the green belt.

The campaign saw allegations of electoral fraud in Woking, which were investigated by the police. These included claims of multiple voter registrations at 6 addresses in Maybury and Sheerwater, intimidation and that blank postal votes had been given community leaders. The investigation saw one man arrested on suspicion of impersonating another voter.

Election result
The results saw the Liberal Democrats become the largest party on the council with 18 seats as compared to 15 for the Conservatives. The Conservatives failed to take any seats from the Liberal Democrats, who gained 3 seats in Horsell West, Knaphill and Mount Hermon East wards and almost won a majority on the council for the first time since 1998 after losing by just 2 votes in Byfleet after 4 recounts. Despite this the Conservatives took more votes across the council than the Liberal Democrats and made a gain from Labour in Maybury and Sheerwater. Labour was reduced to only 3 seats on the council after losing in Maybury and Sheerwater, which was the only ward where they won more than 200 votes. Overall turnout in the election was 42.17%.

Ward results

References

2006
2006 English local elections
2000s in Surrey